Mr. Average is a 2006 Belgian comedy film directed by Pierre-Paul Renders. It was entered into the 28th Moscow International Film Festival.

Cast
 Khalid Maadour as Jalil
 Caroline Dhavernas as Claire
 Chantal Lauby as Françoise
 Gilbert Melki as Didier
 Thierry Lhermitte as President Chastain
 Delphine Rich as Arlette Chastaing
 Amina Annabi as Jalil's mother
 Rachid Chaib as Abdel, Jalil's younger brother
 Zakariya Gouram as Kader
 Pierre Lognay as Jérémie
 Suzan Anbeh as Zoé
 Christelle Cornil as Sandrine
 Thomas Coumans as Call TV presenter
 Jean-Luc Couchard as The Reporter

References

External links
 

2006 films
2006 comedy films
Belgian comedy films
2000s French-language films
French-language Belgian films